The 4th Youth in Film Awards ceremony (now known as the Young Artist Awards), presented by the Youth in Film Association, honored outstanding youth performers under the age of 21 in the fields of film and television for the 1981-1982 season, and took place on November 21, 1982, at the Sheraton Universal Hotel in Universal City, California.

The big winner that year was E.T. the Extra-Terrestrial, with one of the rare "sweeps" in the history of the Youth in Film Awards. The film won all categories for which it was nominated, taking a total of four awards – "Best 'Fantasy' Family Motion Picture", "Best Young Actor in a Motion Picture" for Henry Thomas, "Best Young Supporting Actor in a Motion Picture" for Robert MacNaughton and "Best Young Supporting Actress in a Motion Picture" for Drew Barrymore.

Established in 1978 by long-standing Hollywood Foreign Press Association member, Maureen Dragone, the Youth in Film Association was the first organization to establish an awards ceremony specifically set to recognize and award the contributions of performers under the age of 18 in the fields of film, television, theater and music.

Categories
★ Bold indicates the winner in each category.

Best Young Performer in a Feature Film

Best Young Motion Picture Actor
★ Henry Thomas - E.T. the Extra-Terrestrial (Universal)
Doug McKeon - Night Crossing (Disney)
Matt Dillon - Tex (Disney)

Best Young Motion Picture Actress
★ Aileen Quinn - Annie (Columbia)
Bridgette Andersen - Savannah Smiles (Embassy)
Michelle Pfeiffer - Grease 2 (Paramount)

Best Young Supporting Actor in a Motion Picture
★ Robert MacNaughton - E.T. the Extra-Terrestrial (Universal)
Ian Fried - Rocky III (MGM)
Josh Milrad - The Beastmaster (Film Builder's Corp)
Ronnie Scribner - Split Image (Orion)
Sam Robards - Tempest (Columbia)

Best Young Supporting Actress in a Motion Picture
★ Drew Barrymore - E.T. the Extra-Terrestrial (Universal)
Toni Ann Gisondi - Annie (Columbia)
Heather O'Rourke - Poltergeist (MGM)
Molly Ringwald - Tempest (Columbia)

Best Young Performer in a Television Movie

Best Young Actor in a Movie Made for Television
★ Neil Billingsley - Million Dollar Infield (CBS)
David Faustino - 40 Days for Danny (ABC)
Lance Kerwin - The Shooting (CBS)
Meeno Peluce - Million Dollar Infield (CBS)
Ricky Schroder - Little Lord Fauntelroy (Norman Rosemont Productions)

Best Young Actress in a Movie Made for Television
★ Nancy McKeon - The Facts of Life Goes to Paris (NBC)
Susan Blackstone - The Rules of Marriage (20th Century Fox)
Tara Kennedy - The Electric Grandmother (NBC)
Angela Lee - Breaking Up is Hard To Do (Columbia)
Sydney Penny - The Patricia Neal Story (CBS)
Sydney Penny - The Capture of Grizzly Adams (NBC)

Best Young Performer in a Television Special

Best Young Actor in a Television Special
★ Adam Rich - CBS Children's Mystery Theatre - Zertigo Diamond Caper (CBS)
Scott Constantine - Sam (Associated Film Artists)
Jason Hervey - ABC Afterschool Special - Daddy, I'm Their Mama Now (ABC)
Jason Lively - ABC Afterschool Special - Daddy, I'm Their Mama Now (ABC)
Barret Oliver - The Circle Family (NBC)
Byron Thames - CBS Afternoon Playhouse - Just Pals (CBS)

Best Young Actress in a Television Special
★ Nancy McKeon - Please Don't Hit Me, Mom! (ABC)
Heather Haase - Goldie and Kids: Listen to Us (ABC)
Heather McAdam - CBS Afternoon Playhouse Just Pals (CBS)
Sydney Penny - The Circle Family (NBC)

Best Young Performer in a Television Series

Best Young Actor in a Drama Series 
★ Timothy Gibbs - Father Murphy (NBC)
David Friedman - Little House on the Prairie: A New Beginning (NBC)
Matthew Laborteaux - Little House on the Prairie: A New Beginning (NBC)
Scott Mellini - Father Murphy (NBC)
Adam Rich - Code Red (ABC)

Best Young Actress in a Drama Series
★  (tie) Melissa Gilbert - Little House on the Prairie: A New Beginning (NBC)★  (tie) Jill Whelan - The Love Boat (ABC)
Allison Balson - Little House on the Prairie: A New Beginning (NBC)
Tonya Crowe - Knots Landing (CBS)
Shannen Doherty - Little House on the Prairie: A New Beginning (NBC)
Missy Francis - Little House on the Prairie: A New Beginning (NBC)

Best Young Actor in a Comedy Series
★ Gary Coleman - Diff'rent Strokes (NBC)
Peter Billingsley - Real People (NBC)
Todd Bridges - Diff'rent Strokes (NBC)
Glenn Scarpelli - One Day at a Time (CBS)

Best Young Actress in a Comedy Series
★ Nancy McKeon - The Facts of Life (NBC)
Danielle Brisebois - Archie Bunker's Place (CBS)
Mindy Cohn - The Facts of Life (NBC)
Missy Gold - Benson (ABC)
Kaleena Kiff - Love, Sidney (NBC)
Kari Michaelsen - Gimme a Break! (NBC)
Heather O'Rourke - Happy Days (ABC)
Lisa Whelchel - The Facts of Life (NBC)

Best Young Actor in a New Television Series
★ Ricky Schroder - Silver Spoons (NBC)
Scott Baio - Joanie Loves Chachi (ABC)
Jason Bateman - Silver Spoons (NBC)
Christian Jacobs - Gloria (CBS)
Meeno Peluce - Voyagers! (NBC)
River Phoenix - Seven Brides for Seven Brothers (CBS)

Best Young Actress in a New Television Series
★ Erin Moran - Joanie Loves Chachi (ABC)
Amy Linker - Square Pegs (CBS)
Kathy Maisnik - Star of the Family (ABCd)
Sarah Jessica Parker - Square Pegs (CBS)
Tina Yothers - Family Ties (NBC)

Best Young Actor in a Daytime Series
★ Michael Damian - The Young and the Restless (CBS)
Dick Billingsley - Days of Our Lives (NBC)
Andre Gower - The Young and the Restless (CBS)
David Mendenhall - General Hospital (ABC)
Damian Shaller - Texas (NBC)
John Stamos - General Hospital (ABC)

Best Young Actress in a Daytime Series
★Janine Turner - General Hospital (ABC)
Jennifer Cooke - Guiding Light (CBS)
Liz Keifer - The Young and the Restless (CBS)
Debbie Lytton - Days of Our Lives (NBC)
Lori Loughlin - The Edge of Night (ABC)

Best Young Actor: Guest on a Series
★ Keith Mitchell - Knight Rider (NBC)
Marc Bentley - The Young and the Restless (CBS)
Kirk Brennan - Father Murphy (NBC)
Corey Feldman - The Love Boat (ABC)
Rossie Harris - Hart to Hart (ABC)
Chez Lister - Father Murphy (NBC)
Shavar Ross - Diff'rent Strokes (NBC)
Lance Toyoshima - M*A*S*H (CBS)

Best Young Actress: Guest on a Series
★ Roxana Zal - Hart to Hart (ABC)
Shannen Doherty - Father Murphy (NBC)
Nicole Eggert - Fantasy Island (ABC)
Angela Lee - Quincy, M.E. (NBC)
Sheri Strahl - Little House on the Prairie: A Christmas To Remember (NBC)

Best Family Entertainment

Best Family Motion Picture
★ Rocky III (M.G.M.)
Night Crossing (Disney)
Tex (Disney)
Savannah Smiles (Embassy)

Best Family Motion Picture: Animated, Music or Fantasy
★ E.T. the Extra-Terrestrial (Universal)Annie (Columbia)Grease 2 (Paramount)The Secret of NIMH (M.G.M.)Tron (Disney)Best New Family Television Series
★ Silver Spoons'' (NBC)Knight Rider (NBC)Little House on the Prairie, A New Beginning (NBC)Seven Brides for Seven Brothers (CBS)Star of the Family'' (ABC)

References

External links
Official site

Young Artist Awards ceremonies
1982 film awards
1982 television awards
1982 in American cinema
1982 in American television
Youth in Film